The DGA Lifetime Achievement Award for Distinguished Achievement in Television Direction is an American television award presented by the Directors Guild of America (DGA) honoring career achievement in television direction. Created as a counterpart to the Lifetime Achievement Award for Distinguished Achievement in Motion Picture Direction, it was first awarded at the 67th Directors Guild of America Awards in 2015. Together with the motion picture lifetime achievement award, the award is considered one of the Directors Guild's two highest honors and its recipients are selected by the present and past presidents of the DGA.

Recipients

See also 
 Directors Guild of America Lifetime Achievement Award – Feature Film

References

External links 
 Official DGA website

Awards established in 2015
American television awards
Directors Guild of America Awards
Lifetime achievement awards